Zacharias and Co. (colloquially known as "Zac's") was a waterproof clothing manufacturing firm and retailer based at 26–27 Cornmarket Street Oxford, England.

Abraham Zacharias was a silversmith, jeweller, and watchmaker/clockmaker at 2 Cornmarket and 95 High Street in Oxford. He bought 27 Cornmarket and operated a china and glass warehouse here. Later, by 1880, Abraham Zacharias' son Joel Zacharias was in charge of the business. He married Rebecca Fankenstein from Manchester on 16 August 1882. By 1884, Joel Zacharias was selling waterproof clothing on the Oxford site. He also ran a branch in Manchester.

In the late 1880s, Joel Zacharias expanded the business into 26 Cornmarket next door to the south. The two shops have been combined into a single premises one since this time. By around 1896 Joel Zacharias stopped selling china and glass to concentrate on the waterproof clothing business for which Zacharias and Co. became well-known. Joel Zacharias died in 1905 and the business was taken over by Henry Osborn King of Wolvercote. Henry King's son Cecil King later inherited the business. The original name Zacharias was retained until the business finally closed in 1983.

The slogan "Zac's for Macs" was used by the business.

The site of 26–27 Cornmarket Street subsequently housed a Laura Ashley shop. The building dates from the 15th century. It was completely dismantled and reconstructed closer to its original form. The building is owned by Jesus College, Oxford. The site now houses a Pret a Manger sandwich shop.

References

1983 disestablishments in England
British companies disestablished in 1983
Manufacturing companies disestablished in 1983
Retail companies disestablished in 1983
Shops in Oxford
Defunct manufacturing companies of England
Defunct retail companies of the United Kingdom
Clothing retailers of England
Clothing manufacturers
Outdoor retailers
History of Oxford
Jesus College, Oxford